The Rally for the Republic – Lingui is a political party of Chad. 
At the 2002 parliamentary election it won 1 out of 155 seats.

References 

Political parties in Chad